The Port of Aqaba is the only port in Jordan, and is owned by Aqaba Development Corporation (ADC) and has 12 terminals operated by five operators: the Aqaba Company for port management and operation; Aqaba Container Terminal; Industrial Port Company; phosphate Company; National Electricity power Company, and the pilotage operated by Aqaba Port Marine Services Company .

History 

Aqaba has been a major port since the Iron Age. The Bible refers to the area in (1 Kings 9:26): "King Solomon also built ships in Ezion-Geber, which is near Eloth in Edom, on the shores of the Red Sea," in which Eloth refers to a port on the grounds of Aqaba. The Aqaba port was particularly important after the Ottomans built the Hejaz railway, which connects the port to Damascus and Medina. Today, the economy of Aqaba is largely based around the port sector. Recently, an Abu Dhabi consortium of companies called Al Maabar has won the bid to relocate and manage the Aqaba port for 30 years and expand the existing ferry terminal which receives about 1.3 million passengers and thousands of trucks and cars coming from across the shore in Egypt.

Relocation 

In 2006, the port was relocated from the city's centre to its south, due to a deeper water level there. Another relocation is also scheduled; it would place the port near the southernmost part of the province near the Saudi Arabian border. Its capacity will surpass that of the current port. The project will cost US$5 billion, and it will be completed by 2014.

Aqaba container terminal 

The port contains the Aqaba container terminal (ACT), Jordan's only container port, and the second-busiest facility on the Red Sea by container volume. The ACT is a logistics hub and an important part of the Jordanian economy. It is the primary gateway for the Jordanian market, and a crucial transit point for cargo moving between countries in the region.

The ACT is a joint venture between Aqaba Development Corporation and APM Terminals under a 25-year build-operate-transfer agreement that was signed in 2006. The expansion program, begun in 2009, has included the delivery of two new ship-to-shore cranes with a 22 container row reach, and four rubber tyred gantry cranes.

In 2004, the Aqaba Development Corporation (ADC), on behalf of the Aqaba Special Economic Zone Authority (ASEZA), acquired and took over the management and operation of the terminal. In 2006, a 25-year Joint Development Agreement (JDA) was signed between ADC and ACT. Under this contract, APM Terminals Jordan is responsible for operating, managing and marketing ACT.

References 

Aqaba
Aqaba
Aqaba